Stockholm Exhibition may refer to:

 General Art and Industrial Exposition of Stockholm (1897)
 Stockholm Exhibition (1930)